Selves may refer to:

People
 Carmen Selves (b. 1931), Catalan contemporary painter 
 Justin de Selves (1848-1934), French politician
 Lester Selves (1906-1991), American American football player

Places
 Selves (river), a tributary of the Truyère in the Aveyron department, France

Other
 Selves, the plural of self

See also 
 Self (disambiguation)